Tour Trinity is an office skyscraper in Puteaux, in La Défense, the business district of the Paris metropolitan area.

It was designed by the architectural firm Cro & Co Architecture, directed by the architect Jean-Luc Crochon.

The Tower measures 167 m and offers an area of 49,000 m2 on 33 levels.

Trinity features several architectural innovations:

 An off-center core: the Trinity core is offset on the facade and adorned with panoramic elevators.
 Outdoor spaces: tree-lined terraces, loggias and balconies are accessible over the entire height of the tower.
 Front openings, which allow access to free air on all facades.
 Bioclimatic facades that optimize the supply of natural light.
 A minimum clear height of 2.80 m on all floors.

See also 
 La Défense
 List of tallest buildings and structures in the Paris region
 List of tallest buildings in France

References

External links 
 Tour Trinity

Trinity
La Défense
Office buildings completed in 2020
21st-century architecture in France